Maple Grove Farm is a historic farm property on Boners Run Road in Shawsville, Virginia.  The farm complex includes an early 20th-century Colonial Revival farmhouse and a number of outbuildings, including a small log house that dates to the early period of the property's agricultural use.  The property also includes a small mill complex.  The land was part of a large tract given to Ephraim Vause in 1748, and developed later in the 18th century by the Madison family.  The property was used for dairy and cattle production for most of the 20th century.

The farm was listed on the National Register of Historic Places in 1991.

See also
National Register of Historic Places listings in Montgomery County, Virginia

References

Farms on the National Register of Historic Places in Virginia
National Register of Historic Places in Montgomery County, Virginia
Colonial Revival architecture in Virginia
Buildings and structures completed in 1910
Montgomery County, Virginia